Stupid Things That Mean the World is Tim Bowness's third solo album, released on 17 July 2015 by Inside Out Music. Produced by Bowness and mixed by Bruce Soord, collaborators included Peter Hammill, Colin Edwin, Phil Manzanera and David Rhodes.

The album reached No. 10 in both the official UK Rock and UK Vinyl charts, and No. 1 in Prog magazine's July 2015 and August 2015 charts. In September 2015, Stupid Things That Mean the World was No. 9 in the first ever official UK Progressive chart.

The album appeared in Dave Thompson's top releases of the year in Goldmine and at No. 14 in Prog magazine's critic's chart for 2015 (Issue 62).

Track listing

(all songs by Tim Bowness unless otherwise indicated)

Single CD/vinyl edition

 The Great Electric Teenage Dream (3.58) (Stephen James Bennett/Tim Bowness)
 Sing To Me (5.46) (Tim Bowness/Steven Wilson)
 Where You've Always Been (4.07) (Tim Bowness/Phil Manzanera) 
 Stupid Things That Mean The World (3.05)
 Know That You Were Loved (6.44)
 Press Reset (3.54)
 All These Escapes (3.06) (Tim Bowness/Brian Hulse) 
 Everything You're Not (3.40) 
 Everything But You (1.12)
 Soft William (1.40)
 At The End Of The Holiday (4.58) (Tim Bowness/Andrew Keeling)

2-CD limited-edition media book

Disc 1

 The Great Electric Teenage Dream (3.58) (Stephen James Bennett/Tim Bowness)
 Sing To Me (5.46) (Tim Bowness/Steven Wilson)
 Where You've Always Been (4.07) (Tim Bowness/Phil Manzanera) 
 Stupid Things That Mean The World (3.05)
 Know That You Were Loved (6.44)
 Press Reset (3.54)
 All These Escapes (3.06) (Tim Bowness/Brian Hulse) 
 Everything You're Not (3.40) 
 Everything But You (1.12)
 Soft William (1.40)
 At The End Of The Holiday (4.58) (Tim Bowness/Andrew Keeling)

Disc 2

 Stupid Things That Mean The World (Alternate) (Nick Magnus mix) (3.09) 
 Best Boy Electric (Sing To Me) (1994 No-Man demo) (Steven Wilson mix) (1.58) (Tim Bowness/Steven Wilson)
 Know That You Were Loved (Alternate, David Rhodes 'electric version') (Stephen Bennett mix) (6.29) 
 I Still Miss You (Stupid Things That Mean The World, UXB 'Ambient' Mix) (6.13)

Charts

Personnel

 Tim Bowness – vocals, keyboards, guitar, programming

With:

 Stephen James Bennett – keyboards, programming
 Michael Bearpark - guitars
 Andrew Keeling  - string arrangements, acoustic guitars ('At The End Of The Holiday')
 Colin Edwin – fretless bass, double bass 
 Andrew Booker – drums 
 Pat Mastelotto – drums 
 Charlotte Dowling - violin ensemble 
 Anna Phoebe – violin 
 Bruce Soord - guitar, bass, programming
 Peter Hammill - slide guitar, vocals
 Phil Manzanera - guitar, vocals, keyboards
 David Rhodes - guitar, backing vocals
 Rhys Marsh - pedal steel guitar

References

2015 albums
Tim Bowness albums